Captain Oi! Records is a punk rock and Oi! record label based in High Wycombe, England. The company has released over 300 albums by many notable punk and Oi! bands of the late 1970s and 1980s. The label was set up by Mark Brennan, former bassist of The Business, who had previously co-run Link Records and the Dojo subsidiary of Castle Records.  Brennan's inspiration had been Ace Records, with Captain Oi! targeted at being "the Ace Records of retro punk rock", reissuing material by classic punk bands.

The label's remit expanded with the release of newly recorded albums by bands that fitted in with the style of the label, such as Argy Bargy, and new material by some of the older punk bands including Special Duties and Cockney Rejects. Through its Captain Mod sub-imprint, the label has also reissued albums by Mod revival and 2 Tone artists originally released contemporaneously with the heyday of punk and Oi, including the Selecter, Secret Affair and The Chords.

Partial list of bands on the label

The 4-Skins
999
The Adicts
The Adverts
Angelic Upstarts
Anti-Establishment
Anti Nowhere League
Alternative TV
Bad Manners
Blitz
Buzzcocks
Chaos UK
Chaotic Dischord
Chelsea
Chron Gen
Cockney Rejects
Cock Sparrer
Conflict
The Defects
The Dickies
Discharge
Eddie and the Hot Rods
The Exploited
Extreme Noise Terror
GBH
Goldblade
Judge Dread
Leyton Buzzards
London
The Lurkers
Major Accident
The Members
The Meteors
One Way System
Patrik Fitzgerald
Penetration
Peter and the Test Tube Babies
Ramones
The Rezillos
The Ruts
The Saints
Secret Affair
The Selecter
Sham 69
Sid Vicious
The Skids
Stiff Little Fingers
Tenpole Tudor
Toy Dolls
UK Subs
The Vapors
The Vibrators
Vice Squad

See also
List of record labels

References

External links
Captain Oi! website

British record labels
Reissue record labels
Punk record labels